Steven Victor Tallarico (born March 26, 1948), known professionally as Steven Tyler, is an American singer, best known as the lead singer of the Boston-based rock band Aerosmith, in which he also plays the harmonica, piano and percussion. He has been called the "Demon of Screamin'" due to his high screams and his powerful wide vocal range. He is also known for his on-stage acrobatics. During his performances, Tyler usually dresses in colorful (and sometimes androgynous) outfits and makeup with his trademark scarves hanging from his microphone stand.

In the 1970s, Tyler rose to prominence as the lead singer of Aerosmith, which released such hard rock albums as Toys in the Attic and Rocks, along with a string of hit singles, including "Dream On", "Sweet Emotion" and "Walk This Way". By the late 1970s and early 1980s, Tyler had a heavy drug and alcohol addiction and the band's popularity waned. In 1986, Tyler completed drug rehabilitation and Aerosmith rose to prominence again when Tyler and Joe Perry joined Run-DMC for a re-make of "Walk This Way", which became a Top 5 hit. Aerosmith subsequently launched a comeback with the multi-platinum albums Permanent Vacation, Pump, Get a Grip and Nine Lives, which produced a combined thirteen Top 40 singles and won the band numerous awards. During this time, the band embarked on their longest concert tours, promoted their singles with conceptual music videos, and made appearances in television, film and video games.

Since the late 1980s, Tyler has embarked on several solo endeavors, including guest appearances with musicians such as Alice Cooper, Mötley Crüe, Santana, Pink and Keith Anderson, film and TV work, authoring a book, and solo music, including the Top 40 single "(It) Feels So Good" in 2011. Tension with his Aerosmith bandmates boiled in 2009 and 2010 after he fell off the stage at a concert, had a relapse with prescription drugs, receiving treatment in 2009, and signed on to American Idol without telling his bandmates. But Tyler has continued to record music and perform with Aerosmith, after more than 50 years in the band. In 2016, Tyler released his debut solo album, We're All Somebody from Somewhere, a country rock album that included the single "Love Is Your Name". Tyler supported the album with the "Out on a Limb" tour. Tyler continues to perform both solo, with backing from the Loving Mary Band, and with Aerosmith.

Tyler is included among Rolling Stone's 100 Greatest Singers. He was ranked third on Hit Parader's Top 100 Metal Vocalists of All Time. In 2001, he was inducted into the Rock and Roll Hall of Fame with Aerosmith and in 2013, Tyler and his songwriting partner Joe Perry received the ASCAP Founders Award and were inducted into the Songwriters Hall of Fame.

Early life 
Steven Victor Tallarico was born on March 26, 1948, at the Stuyvesant Polyclinic in Manhattan, New York, and moved to the Bronx when he was three years old. The family relocated to 100 Pembrook Drive in Northeast Yonkers in 1957 when he was about nine years old. Tallarico is the son of Susan Ray (June 2, 1925July 4, 2008), a secretary, and Victor A. Tallarico (May 14, 1916September 10, 2011), a classical musician and pianist who taught music at Cardinal Spellman High School in The Bronx.

Tyler's father was of Italian and German descent, while his mother was of Polish, English and African-American ancestry. He has claimed on a number of occasions that his maternal grandfather was Ukrainian, and changed his surname from "Czarnyszewicz" (from ) to "Blancha" (possibly from ). Genealogist Megan Smolenyak established that Steven Tyler's grandfather was Polish, born Felix Czarnyszewicz in 1892 in Klichaw, in today's Belarus. In 1914 he emigrated to the US and changed his surname to Blancha. There he married Bessie Elliott, with whom he had four children, including Steven's mother Susan. Felix's brother was Florian Czarnyszewicz, a well-known Polish writer who emigrated to Argentina. Florian Czarnyszewicz is best known for his novel Nadberezeńcy which describes the fate of Poles living in the lands between the Berezina and Dnieper rivers between 1911 and 1920.

His paternal grandfather, Giovanni Tallarico, was from Cotronei, Calabria, Italy. Tyler learned on the genealogy show Who Do You Think You Are? that his maternal great-great-great-grandfather Robert Elliot was part African-American and part European-American. Steven has one older sister named Lynda.

Tyler attended Roosevelt High School on Tuckahoe Road in Yonkers, New York which was about a mile from his house, but was expelled from the school just before graduation due to marijuana use. He later graduated from Quintano School for Young Professionals.

At 17, Tyler spent time in Greenwich Village, New York, the highlight of which was seeing a Rolling Stones concert. Tyler states that he and his friends "hung around for a while, buzzing like crazy just because we got to touch them." He added, "Everybody told me that I looked just like Mick Jagger with my big lips and Keith Richards basically was the music I used to love more than anything." A photo in the band's autobiography Walk This Way shows Tyler standing behind Mick Jagger outside a hotel.

During this period, Tyler sang backing vocals on The Left Banke Too, the second album by baroque pop group the Left Banke.

Career

Formation and success of Aerosmith (1970–1978) 

Before Aerosmith, Tyler wrote what would become one of Aerosmith's signature songs, "Dream On". In 1969, Tyler attended a local rock show in Sunapee, New Hampshire, where he first saw future bandmates Joe Perry (guitars) and Tom Hamilton (bass), who at the time were playing in a band called the Jam Band. Tyler later stated he was struck by their raw power and attitude.

Around 1970, Tyler, Perry and Hamilton decided to form a band. Tyler, who had played drums in many of his previous bands while in school, insisted that he would be the frontman and lead singer. Joey Kramer, an old acquaintance of Tyler's from New York, was recruited to play the drums. Tyler invited his boyhood friend, Ray Tabano, to play rhythm guitar. Driven by a collective ambition to launch their careers as full-time musicians and hopeful recording artists, the band moved to the Boston area, and shared a small apartment at 1325 Commonwealth Avenue in Allston in the fall of 1970.

Shortly after relocating to Boston, Tyler's dissatisfaction with Tabano's lack of passion and dedication prompted the band to replace Tabano with Brad Whitford. Although Tyler was never billed as the "leader" of Aerosmith, he co-managed, with drummer Joey Kramer, the assets of the band and directed its activities during this formative period.

After spending time on the Boston club circuit under the tutelage of their first manager, Frank Connelly, the band began working with New York managers Steve Leber and David Krebs. Leber describes the band as "the closest thing I've ever seen to the Rolling Stones". In early 1972, the managers arranged the gig at the legendary nightclub Max's Kansas City to showcase the group to record company executives. They subsequently signed a record deal with Columbia Records in 1972 and released their eponymous debut album in 1973. This was followed by their second album, Get Your Wings in 1974.

Around this time, Aerosmith continued to tour wherever they could and opened for bands like Mott the Hoople. The band had a minor hit in "Dream On", which peaked at number 59 in 1973, but Aerosmith did not break into the mainstream until the back-to-back releases of their next sets of albums, Toys in the Attic (1975) and Rocks (1976). In 1975, they achieved their first top-40 hit in "Sweet Emotion". Soon after, "Dream On" was re-released and hit number six in 1976, followed by another top-10 hit "Walk This Way". Additionally, Rocks produced the hit singles "Last Child", "Back in the Saddle" and "Home Tonight".

By 1976, Aerosmith found themselves headlining huge stadiums and major rock music festivals. That year, Tyler emerged as a prominent rock star and sex symbol in his own right, gracing the cover of Rolling Stone magazine. The band's fifth album, Draw the Line, catapulted them to international fame and recognition, launching tours in Europe and Japan. A series of Hot 100 hits continued throughout the remainder of the decade, including "Draw the Line", "Kings and Queens" and "Chip Away the Stone". Aerosmith's first five albums have 
all since gone multiplatinum and all five are considered to be among the greatest hard rock albums of all time.

Aerosmith toured heavily throughout the mid- to late 1970s, and their live shows during this time period were captured through 1978's live album Live! Bootleg and the 1989 VHS release Live Texxas Jam '78. Also in 1978, Tyler made his acting debut as the leader of the Future Villain Band in the film Sgt. Pepper's Lonely Hearts Club Band, alongside his Aerosmith bandmates. The film also spawned Aerosmith's cover of the Beatles hit "Come Together", which was Aerosmith's last top-40 single for nine years.

Decline of Aerosmith (1979–1983) 
As the decade wore on, the fast-paced life of touring, recording, living together and using drugs began to take its toll on the band. Tyler and Perry often were called the Toxic Twins for their legendary intake of stimulants and heroin. Their relationship is well documented in many of Aerosmith's video releases, as well as in the Aerosmith Behind the Music. On July 28, 1979, after a huge quarrel at a World Series of Rock concert in Cleveland, Perry left Aerosmith to begin his own band, the Joe Perry Project. Night in the Ruts was released that fall, and Aerosmith forged on with new guitarist Jimmy Crespo.

In the fall of 1980, Tyler was injured in a motorcycle crash that left him hospitalized for two months, and unable to tour or record for much of 1981. When the band reconvened in the studio, Tyler formed a writing partnership with Crespo, co-writing and producing the album Rock in a Hard Place (1982). Brad Whitford had left in 1981, shortly after recording the guitar parts for the album's lead single, "Lightning Strikes". Whitford was replaced by Rick Dufay, and the band continued to tour into 1983. As the 1980s decade wore on, Tyler's drug abuse increased. His heroin addiction was at its worst between 1979 and 1982, when he would roam the streets of New York City looking for dealers.

Reuniting and getting clean (1984–1986) 
On February 14, 1984, Perry and Whitford, who left the band in 1979 and 1981, respectively, attended an Aerosmith show. According to the band's Behind the Music special on VH1, Tyler alleged that he made the first phone call to Perry, encouraging them to meet up again. Backstage, they all met and Perry and Whitford agreed to join the band once again. With the new reunion, the band also fired their managers Leber and Krebs, hired new manager Tim Collins (who was managing Joe Perry), and signed a new record contract with Geffen Records. Aerosmith embarked on a reunion tour, the Back in the Saddle Tour, and recorded once again, releasing Done with Mirrors in 1985. However, the band was still using drugs, especially Tyler, who collapsed while performing in Springfield, Illinois, on the 1984 tour. In 1986, the band held a meeting in which the band members staged an intervention on Tyler, and persuaded him to enter a drug rehabilitation program. After he completed rehabilitation, his bandmates did likewise; all had completed treatment by the mid-1980s.

Comeback and superstardom (1986–1999) 

Aerosmith rose to prominence again when Tyler and Perry appeared on Run–D.M.C.'s cover of Aerosmith's "Walk This Way" in 1986, a track that combined elements of hip-hop and rock, that broke down the barriers between the two genres, broke rap into the mainstream, and introduced Aerosmith to a new generation. The track hit number four on the charts and launched a famous music video that had heavy rotation. This paved the way for Aerosmith to mount a significant comeback. Tyler and Perry renewed their songwriting partnership, but were also working with outside songwriting collaborators brought in by the record company, such as Desmond Child and Jim Vallance. To give Aerosmith a slick sound accessible to mainstream audiences, they received help from producer Bruce Fairbairn. Aerosmith released Permanent Vacation in 1987, which became a huge multiplatinum success and launched three top-20 hits ("Dude (Looks Like a Lady)", "Angel" and "Rag Doll"). The band launched a tour with the emerging Guns N' Roses, opening many shows. Permanent Vacation was followed by 1989's Pump, which was even more successful, selling 7 million copies and producing three top-10 hits ("Love in an Elevator", "Janie's Got a Gun" and "What it Takes") and one top-40 hit ("The Other Side"). Pump in particular had Tyler expand his musical horizons, co-writing the innovative hit "Janie's Got a Gun", which won the first Grammy award for the band. The band toured with many emerging acts and performed in locations such as Australia for the first time. In the late 1980s, Tyler also guested on albums by comedian Sam Kinison, Alice Cooper (a fellow '70s rocker also launching a successful comeback) and popular contemporaries Mötley Crüe. Around that time, Tyler and Perry appeared at a Bon Jovi concert in Milton Keynes and performed "Walk This Way".

With the twin successes of Permanent Vacation and Pump, the band became an MTV sensation and Tyler became a household name. The band was featured on a "Wayne's World" sketch on Saturday Night Live in 1990, which was listed by E! in 2004 as SNL'''s most unforgettable moment. That same year, Aerosmith recorded one of the first episodes of MTV Unplugged. In 1991, Aerosmith was one of the first bands to be featured on The Simpsons. That year, the band also signed a $30 million record deal with their old label Columbia, for which they would begin recording the following year. The box set Pandora's Box was released by Columbia in late 1991, and the band filmed a music video for "Sweet Emotion" to promote the release. Earlier in the year, the band also performed "Dream On" with an orchestra at MTV's 10th Anniversary celebration; their filmed performance was used as the official video for the song. After a brief break, the band returned to the studio in 1992 to record their next album. The band's A&R man John Kalodner criticized some of the early material being considered for this album, targeting Tyler's sexually profane lyrics in particular.

However, the band eventually began recording again and released Get a Grip in 1993, which became their most successful album worldwide, selling over 15 million copies and producing a series of hit singles ("Cryin'", "Livin' on the Edge", "Eat the Rich", "Amazing" and "Crazy"). While the album had mixed reviews and received some criticism for over-using outside collaborators, Aerosmith won more awards during this time than any other, winning two Grammy Awards, four MTV Video Music Awards, two American Music Awards, a People's Choice award and a Billboard Award. The band became well known for their videos at this time, which featured film-like storylines and up-and-coming actors and actresses such as Edward Furlong, Stephen Dorff, Jason London, Josh Holloway and most notably Alicia Silverstone. Tyler's daughter Liv made her acting debut in the band's video for "Crazy" in 1994. The band also launched their biggest and most extensive tour yet, performing over 240 shows in nearly 30 countries, including touring Latin America for the first time and performing in many European countries for the first time.

After the 18-month Get a Grip Tour ended in December 1994, the band took a break in 1995 to spend time with their families. They needed to rest due to the grueling lifestyle of the previous 10 years under the helm of manager Tim Collins, who helped orchestrate much of the band's comeback and sustained success. Tyler and Perry also began writing for a new album, and the band performed a couple of one-off shows in Boston to try out the new material. They also vacationed together with their families in Florida. Aerosmith, however, almost broke up after Tim Collins spread rumors that band members were deriding each other and that Tyler was being unfaithful to his wife and using drugs again during recording sessions in Miami. The band subsequently fired Collins in 1996 in the middle of recording for their next album. In 1997, they released Nine Lives, which went double platinum, launched three hits ("Falling in Love (Is Hard on the Knees)", "Hole in My Soul" and "Pink"), and won the band their fourth Grammy for "Pink". They toured for over two years in support of the album. In 1997, Tyler and Perry were featured in a commercial for the GAP. That fall, the band's tell-all autobiography was released.

In 1998, while on tour in support of Nine Lives, Tyler suffered a ligament injury when a microphone stand fell hard onto his knee. Tyler and the band finished the show, but they had to cancel several dates, and Tyler had to wear a leg cast while filming the video for "I Don't Want to Miss a Thing". The song was the band's first number-one hit and the only song to date by a rock band to debut at number one on the Hot 100. It has since become a slow-dance staple, and at the time introduced Aerosmith and Steven Tyler to yet another new generation. The song was written for the film Armageddon, which featured Tyler's daughter Liv. In 1999, Tyler and Perry joined Kid Rock and Run–D.M.C. to perform "Walk This Way" at the MTV Video Music Awards. Earlier that year, the band had the Rock 'n' Roller Coaster Starring Aerosmith open at Walt Disney World.

 Continued success and touring (2000–2008) 

In 2001, Aerosmith played at the Super Bowl XXXV halftime show and was inducted into the Rock and Roll Hall of Fame. The band released the album Just Push Play, which featured the top-10 hit "Jaded". At the 2001 Indianapolis 500, Tyler sang the National Anthem in traditional Aerosmith style – complete with a raspy voice, bluesy swagger and a hard rocker yell. When Tyler sang the National Anthem, he changed the words which caused a public outcry. Instead of singing "Land of the free and the home of the brave", he changed the words to "Land of the free and the home of the Indianapolis 500." This received negative reactions from veterans and fans, leading Tyler to issue a public apology.

In 2002, Aerosmith's two-hour-long Behind the Music was released, chronicling the band's tumultuous history and current activities and touring. They were also honored as MTV Icons. In the summer, they released the compilation O, Yeah! The Ultimate Aerosmith Hits, which went double platinum and included the new track "Girls of Summer".

In 2003, Tyler received an honorary degree from Berklee College of Music, and in 2005, received an honorary doctorate from the University of Massachusetts Boston. In 2003, he inducted AC/DC into the Rock and Roll Hall of Fame. Later in the year, he went on tour with Aerosmith for the Rocksimus Maximus Tour with KISS. In 2004, Aerosmith released the blues cover album Honkin' on Bobo and launched a brief tour with Cheap Trick, focused on smaller markets. Tyler sang the National Anthem to kick off the 2004 World Series at Fenway Park. The 2004 film The Polar Express featured Tyler singing "Rockin' on Top of the World" alongside a group of computer-animated elves resembling Aerosmith.

In 2005, Tyler sang lead vocals on Santana's hit single "Just Feel Better" and made a cameo appearance in the film Be Cool. In 2006, after recovering from throat surgery and the grueling Rockin' the Joint Tour, Tyler performed with Joe Perry and the Boston Pops Orchestra for the orchestra's annual Fourth of July concert, his first major public appearance since the surgery. That year, Tyler recorded a duet with country music artist Keith Anderson, titled "Three Chord Country and American Rock & Roll".

Later that year, the Aerosmith compilation Devil's Got a New Disguise was released, which included two new tracks. Tyler hit the road with Aerosmith again for the Route of All Evil Tour with Mötley Crüe and also made several more public appearances. He made a cameo appearance on the sitcom Two and a Half Men, playing himself. On October 14, 2006, Tyler sang "God Bless America" during the seventh-inning stretch at game three of the National League Championship Series between the St. Louis Cardinals and the New York Mets at Busch Stadium in St. Louis. On November 24, he volunteered by serving Thanksgiving dinner to the needy at a restaurant in West Palm Beach, Florida, before an Aerosmith show there. In 2007, Tyler kept active in Aerosmith with the band's world tour which had them perform in 19 countries. That same year, Steven and Liv Tyler were profiled on E! True Hollywood Story.On May 21, 2008, Tyler checked into Las Encinas Hospital rehabilitation clinic in Pasadena, California, to recover from multiple leg surgeries. He made a public statement saying,  "The 'foot repair' pain was intense, greater than I'd anticipated. The months of rehabilitative care and the painful strain of physical therapy were traumatic. I really needed a safe environment to recuperate where I could shut off my phone and get back on my feet." In June 2008, Guitar Hero: Aerosmith was released, the franchise's first video game based solely around one band and the most successful game based around a band. On July 14, 2008, Tyler's mother, Susan Tallarico, died at age 84.

On July 18, 2008, Tyler appeared with Billy Joel at the last concert to be played at Shea Stadium. Backed by Joel's band, he sang lead vocals on "Walk This Way". In August 2008, HarperCollins won an auction to publish Tyler's autobiography. That same month, Tyler performed with trumpeter Chris Botti in Boston. The concert was released as a CD/DVD, Chris Botti In Boston in March 2009. In December 2008, Tyler made a surprise appearance at the Trans-Siberian Orchestra concerts at Nassau Coliseum (December 12, 2008) and the Izod Center (December 13, 2008). At the Izod Center, he collaborated with the Trans-Siberian Orchestra on "Dream On" and "Sweet Emotion".

 Touring, American Idol, Does the Noise in My Head Bother You? and Music from Another Dimension! (2009–2014) 

On August 5, 2009, while on the Guitar Hero Aerosmith Tour, Tyler fell off a stage near Sturgis, South Dakota, injuring his head and neck and breaking his shoulder. He was airlifted to Rapid City Regional Hospital. (August 8, 2009; published by the Associated Press); retrieved August 11, 2009. Aerosmith was forced to cancel the rest of their 2009 tour, except for two shows in Hawaii in October.

On November 9, 2009, the media reported that Tyler had no contact with the other members of Aerosmith and that they were unsure if he was still in the band. On November 10, 2009, Joe Perry confirmed Tyler had quit Aerosmith to pursue a solo career and was unsure whether the move was indefinite. No replacement was announced. Despite rumors of leaving the band, and notwithstanding Perry's comment as reported earlier the same day, Tyler joined the Joe Perry Project onstage November 10, 2009, at the Fillmore New York at Irving Plaza and performed "Walk This Way". According to sources at the event, Tyler assured the crowd that despite rumors to the contrary, he is "not quitting Aerosmith."

On December 22, 2009, Rolling Stone reported that Tyler had checked into rehab for pain management. In 2010, he embarked on the Cocked, Locked, Ready to Rock Tour with Aerosmith, which had them perform over 40 concerts in 18 countries. On September 16, 2010, it was reported he would have his first solo project. He wrote "Love Lives", a theme song for the Japanese sci-fi movie Space Battleship Yamato. The song was based on the English translated script, as well as on some clips of the film itself. The single was released on November 24, a week before the movie was released.

On September 22, 2010, Fox confirmed that Tyler would replace Simon Cowell as a judge for the tenth season of American Idol alongside Randy Jackson and fellow new judge Jennifer Lopez (who replaced Kara DioGuardi and Ellen DeGeneres). In December 2010, Tyler performed at the Kennedy Center Honors, honoring Paul McCartney by performing several tracks from Abbey Road.

On January 19, 2011, Tyler made his debut appearance as a judge on American Idol during the premiere of the show's 10th season, which aired through the end of May. On April 2, 2011, Tyler presented an award at the 2011 Kids' Choice Awards. The following day, he performed with Carrie Underwood at the Academy of Country Music Awards. Underwood and Tyler performed Underwood's song "Undo It" and completed their segment with an energetic version of the Aerosmith classic "Walk This Way". On May 3, 2011, he released his autobiography Does the Noise in My Head Bother You?, which reached number two on The New York Times Best Seller List in the category Hardcover Non-fiction. The book was accompanied by the new single "(It) Feels So Good", released May 10. The single reached number 35 on the Billboard Hot 100. In addition, during breaks in between Idol, Tyler worked on new material for Aerosmith's next studio album. Tyler performed the Aerosmith song "Dream On" on the season finale of American Idol on May 25.

In September 2011, he starred as the inspiration for Andy Hilfiger's fashion line, "Andrew Charles".  Tyler developed a signature scarf collection called "Rock Scarf" for Andrew Charles. On October 22, 2011, Tyler set off for an 18-date Aerosmith tour across Latin America and Japan. On October 25, it was reported by TMZ that Tyler slipped in his hotel shower in Paraguay and injured his face, including losing several teeth. Tyler was rushed to the hospital, and the scheduled show was postponed for the following night. When he did finally perform after the opening song, he proudly displayed his broken tooth which he had on a string around his neck. He then removed his sunglasses to reveal a nasty black eye.

On January 22, 2012, Tyler sang the National Anthem at the AFC Championship Game. On March 11, 2012, a special about Aerosmith aired on 60 Minutes, where some of the comments made by the band members highlighted the still-contentious relationships in the band. On March 22, Perry surprised Tyler with a performance of "Happy Birthday" on American Idol in advance of Tyler's 64th birthday. On March 26, 2012, Aerosmith announced their "Global Warming Tour" with dates in many major North American cities from June 16 to August 8, preceded by a performance on May 30 for Walmart shareholders. In April, a Burger King television commercial featuring Tyler debuted. Aerosmith's new album, Music from Another Dimension! was set for release on November 6, 2012 and the band debuted their new single "Legendary Child" with a performance of the song on the season finale of American Idol on May 23.

On July 12, 2012, Tyler announced that he would be leaving American Idol after two seasons, with a statement saying, "After some long ... hard ... thoughts ... I've decided it's time for me to let go of my mistress 'American Idol' before she boils my rabbit. I strayed from my first love, AEROSMITH, and I'm back — but instead of begging on my hands and knees, I got two fists in the air and I'm kicking the door open with my band. The next few years are going to be dedicated to kicking some serious ass — the ultimate in auditory takeover ..." However, the reports suggest that Tyler was dumped by the American Idol bosses. Tyler has since indicated that his troubles with his bandmates were the primary reason he signed up to do American Idol. He was replaced by Keith Urban.

On August 12, Aerosmith wrapped up the first leg of their Global Warming Tour with a rescheduled performance in Bristow, Virginia, and on August 28, the band released two singles simultaneously, the rocker "Lover Alot" and the ballad "What Could Have Been Love", both of which were coproduced and cowritten by Tyler. On September 22, Aerosmith performed at the iHeartRadio music festival in Las Vegas. On November 6, the new Aerosmith album Music from Another Dimension! was released, and on November 8, the band began the second leg of their Global Warming Tour, which took the band to 14 North American cities through December 13. On January 21, 2013, Aerosmith released "Can't Stop Lovin' You" (featuring Carrie Underwood) as the fourth single from Music from Another Dimension!. He briefly returned to American Idol in season 12, auditioning dressed up as a woman named "Pepper" in front of the judges (Randy Jackson, Nicki Minaj, Keith Urban and Mariah Carey).

On February 20, it was announced that Tyler and his songwriting partner Joe Perry would be recipients of the ASCAP Founders Award at the society's 30th Annual Pop Music Awards on April 17. Two days later, it was announced that the duo would be inducted into the Songwriters Hall of Fame at a ceremony to be held on June 13.

In late April and early May 2013, Aerosmith extended their Global Warming Tour to Australia, New Zealand, the Philippines and Singapore. This marked the band's first performances in Australia in 23 years, and the band's first-ever performances in the latter three countries. While down-under in April 2013, Tyler told New Zealand media of his "dear Maori friends" and why the band had opted only to play Dunedin for their first New Zealand concert date. He also confessed to having the hots for J-Lo (Jennifer Lopez) while working on American Idol and told of how it turned out to be one of the best things he ever did. Tyler also appeared in Moscow, Russia, on November 9 for the Miss Universe 2013 pageant as one of the judges and performed "Dream On". On May 30, Aerosmith performed as part of the "Boston Strong" charity concert for victims of the Boston Marathon bombing. The band also performed at a handful of shows in the U.S. and Japan in July and August In the fall of 2013, Aerosmith extended their tour to Central and South America, including their first-ever performances in Guatemala, El Salvador and Uruguay.

From May 17 to June 28, 2014, Tyler performed 15 shows with Aerosmith on the European leg of the Global Warming Tour. This was followed by the Let Rock Rule Tour (featuring Slash with Myles Kennedy and the Conspirators as the opening act), which sent Aerosmith to 19 locations across North America from July 10 to September 12.

 We're All Somebody from Somewhere solo album, "Out on a Limb" solo tour, and continued touring with Aerosmith (2015–2022) 

On March 31, 2015, Tyler stated that he was working on his first solo country album. On April 6, it was announced that he signed a record deal with Scott Borchetta's Dot Records (a division of the Big Machine Label Group). On May 13, Tyler released the lead single, "Love Is Your Name", from his forthcoming debut album. He promoted the song on  the Bobby Bones Show, iHeartMedia, CBS This Morning, Entertainment Tonight and the American Idol season-14 finale. To increase his exposure to the country audience, Tyler appeared as himself in an episode of the musical drama series Nashville, performing a cover of "Crazy" with Juliette Barnes (portrayed by Hayden Panettiere).

On June 13, Tyler rejoined his Aerosmith bandmates for the Blue Army Tour, which sent the band to 17 North American locations through August 7; this was followed by a one-off performance in Moscow on September 5. From the fall of 2015 through the spring of 2016, Tyler completed work on his solo album, We're All Somebody from Somewhere, which was released on July 15, 2016. A second single, "Red, White & You", was released in January 2016, followed by the third single (the title track) in June 2016. From July through September 2016, Tyler will be performing with his backing band Loving Mary on the 19-date Out on a Limb Tour; this was preceded by a pair of performances in Niagara Falls in March 2016 and a benefit show for his charity Janie's Fund in New York City in May 2016.

Since December 2015, in various interviews, Tyler and fellow Aerosmith bandmates Brad Whitford and Joe Perry all discussed the possibility of an Aerosmith farewell tour or "wind-down tour" slated to start in 2017. Perry has suggested the tour could last for two years and Tyler said it could potentially last "forever"; Tyler and Whitford also discussed the potential of doing one last studio album.

From September through October 2016, Tyler rejoined Aerosmith for a nine-date tour of Latin America, called the Rock 'N' Roll Rumble Tour, preceded by a performance at the Kaaboo Festival in San Diego.

In April 2017, Tyler performed with Aerosmith in Phoenix, Arizona for the NCAA Final Four men's basketball tournament and also performed two solo shows with Loving Mary in Japan. Tyler rejoined Aerosmith for a "farewell" tour of Europe in the spring and summer of 2017, titled the Aero-Vederci Baby! Tour. After the European leg concluded in July, the band played in South America in September and October 2017 The last few dates of the tour had to be canceled, however, due to health issues. Tyler also performed a handful of solo shows in 2017 with the Loving Mary Band.

In January 2018, Tyler hosted an inaugural red carpet gala for his charity "Janie's Fund" during the 60th Grammy Awards. In February, he starred in a commercial for Kia Motors that aired during Super Bowl LII; the ad featured Tyler as a race car driver that went back in time, set to the soundtrack of the Aerosmith classic "Dream On". In the spring and summer of 2018, Tyler played approximately two dozen concerts across North America and Europe with the Loving Mary Band as his backing band.

On August 15, Tyler appeared with Aerosmith on NBC's Today show to announce a residency in Las Vegas called "Deuces Are Wild", a reference to both Las Vegas casino gambling and their 1994 single of the same name. The band was booked to play 50 shows from April 2019 thru June 2020 at the Park Theater. In July and August 2019, it performed at a festival in Minnesota and played nine shows at three MGM venues in Maryland, New Jersey and Massachusetts.

In March 2022, Aerosmith announced the return of the Deuces Are Wild residency, which was set to begin in June. On May 24, 2022, the band announced that the June and July dates would be canceled due to Tyler checking himself into a rehab facility. The band shared that Tyler relapsed after having foot surgery to prepare for the upcoming shows.

 Dirico Motorcycles (Red Wing Motorcycles) 
On September 15, 2007, at New Hampshire International Speedway, Tyler announced the launch of Dirico Motorcycles, which are designed by Tyler, engineered by Mark Dirico, and built by AC Custom Motorcycles in Manchester, New Hampshire. Tyler has been a long-time motorcycle fan and riding enthusiast,
Steven Tyler also participates in a variety of charity auctions involving motorcycles, including the Ride for Children charity.

 Politics 
In the early months of 2013, an act was forwarded into the Hawaii legislature entitled the Steven Tyler Act (Hawaii Senate Bill 465). The act would give more privacy to public figures such as government officials and celebrities on vacation. Tyler and numerous other celebrities all lobbied for it. The legislation would give public figures the right to sue paparazzi for taking unwanted photographs. The bill's sponsor is Maui state legislator J. Kalani English. The bill was cleared through the Judiciary Committee on Friday, February 8, 2013.

In August 2015, Aerosmith attended the first Republican Party presidential debate held in Cleveland, as the band was in town for a Pro Bowl concert appearance. Tyler was reportedly a guest of candidate Donald Trump, rather than sitting with the band. Tyler's agent told reporters that he was there to promote his copyright reform ideas.

 Personal life 

 Family and relationships 
In 1975, Tyler obtained guardianship of 16-year-old Julia Holcomb, so that she could live with him in Boston. They dated and took drugs together for three years. Holcomb was referred to by the pseudonym "Diana Hall" by the editor of the Aerosmith autobiography Walk This Way in an attempt to conceal her identity, but other sources have confirmed her identity. Pressures leading to their split included their age difference (Tyler was 27 when they first met), a withdrawn marriage proposal, a house fire and a planned pregnancy that resulted in an abortion when Tyler was worried that the fire's smoke, as well as drugs, might lead to birth defects. Look Away, a documentary about sexual abuse in the rock music industry, features Holcomb's story.

Band member Ray Tabano wrote in Walk This Way that the abortion "really messed Steven up," because the fetus was male. Tyler wrote, "It was a big crisis. It's a major thing when you're growing something with a woman, but they convinced us that it would never work out and would ruin our lives. You go to the doctor and they put the needle in her belly and they squeeze the stuff in and you watch. And it comes out dead. I was pretty devastated. In my mind, I'm going, Jesus, what have I done?"

Holcomb filed suit in December 2022, alleging that Tyler sexually assaulted her and forced her to undergo the abortion, plying her with drugs and alcohol after promising to care for her in the guardianship agreement.

Tyler had a brief relationship with fashion model Bebe Buell, during which he fathered actress Liv Tyler, born in 1977. Buell initially claimed that the father was Todd Rundgren to protect her daughter from Tyler's drug addiction. Through Liv's marriage to British musician Royston Langdon and relationship with entertainment manager David Gardner, Tyler has three grandchildren.

In 1978, he married Cyrinda Foxe, an ex-Warhol model and the former wife of New York Dolls' lead singer David Johansen, and fathered model Mia Tyler (born on December 22, 1978). He and Foxe divorced in 1987; in 1997, she published Dream On: Livin' on the Edge With Steven Tyler and Aerosmith, a memoir of her life with Tyler. Foxe died from brain cancer in 2002.

On May 28, 1988, in Tulsa, Oklahoma, Tyler married clothing designer Teresa Barrick. With Barrick, he fathered a daughter, Chelsea, in 1989 and a son, Taj, in 1991. In February 2005, the couple announced that they were separating due to personal problems.
The divorce was finalized in January 2006.

Tyler began a relationship with Erin Brady (later Miss USA 2013) in 2006. They got engaged in December 2011. In January 2013, Tyler and Brady broke off their engagement.

 Health 
In 2006, immediately after a two-hour performance in Florida, Tyler got into an argument during which he yelled. He awoke the next morning to find that he had a hoarse voice. On March 22, 2006, the Washington Post reported that Tyler would undergo surgery for an "undisclosed medical condition".  A statement from Tyler's publicist read in part, "Despite Aerosmith's desire to keep the tour going as long as possible, [Tyler's] doctors advised him not to continue performing to give his voice time to recover." Aerosmith's remaining North American tour dates in 2006 on the Rockin' the Joint Tour were subsequently canceled.

The cause was diagnosed as a ruptured blood vessel in his throat, which was successfully sealed off using a laser by Dr. Steven M. Zeitels, director of the Massachusetts General Hospital Center for Laryngeal Surgery and Voice Rehabilitation. In the words of Tyler: "He just took a laser and zapped the blood vessel." After a few weeks of rest, Tyler and the rest of Aerosmith entered the studio on May 20, 2006, to begin work on their new album.

Tyler's first public performance after the surgery was July 3–4, 2006, with Joe Perry at the Hatch Shell in Boston, with the Boston Pops Orchestra. The duo sang "Dream On", "Walk This Way" and "I Don't Want to Miss a Thing" as part of the Boston Pops July 4 Fireworks Spectacular. Tyler's throat surgery was featured in 2007 on an episode of the National Geographic Channel series, Incredible Human Machine.

In a September 2006 interview with Access Hollywood, Tyler revealed that he had been suffering from hepatitis C for the past 11 years. He was diagnosed with the disease in 2003 and had undergone extensive treatment from 2003 to 2006, including 11 months of interferon therapy, which he said was "agony". The disease is usually spread through blood-to-blood contact, or with sharing used needles.

Tyler has publicly acknowledged his struggles with drug and alcohol addiction. In a 2019 interview, Tyler recalled: "'There was a moment in '88 where management and the band pulled an intervention on me. They thought, "Get the lead singer sober, and all our problems would be over"...I am grateful and owe a thanks to them for my sobriety'". Tyler added: "'I have had many times in my life where I just couldn't handle — whether it was a marriage or my addiction had reared its ugly head — and the rest of the guys in the band are not unlike that. But we have all seen each other through it, and we are here today'".

 Gender 
Tyler has been known to have an androgynous persona both on and offstage such as flamboyant clothes and makeup. In his 2011 memoir Does the Noise in My Head Bother You?, Tyler wrote, "I've been misquoted as saying that I'm more female than male. Let me set the record straight -- it's more half and half, and I love the fact that my feelings are akin to puella eternis (Latin for "the eternal girl"). What better to be like than the stronger of the species?". (Correct Latin would be "puella aeterna").

Discography

Studio albums

 Singles 

 Collaborative work 

 Music videos 

 Filmography 

 Philanthropy 
Tyler launched Janie's Fund – named after Aerosmith's 1989 track "Janie's Got a Gun" – in 2015 to providing protection and counseling for young female victims of abuse, and he has helped raise over $2.4 million for the organization since then. Janie's House, established in 2017 in Atlanta, offers shelter for victims of abuse or neglect, with space for 30 live-in clients and 24-hour medical facilities available.

 Awards and nominations 

Emmy Award nomination in 2011: – Outstanding Performer in an Animated Program – for playing the Mad Hatter on Wonder Pets: Adventures in Wonderland''

References

External links 

 
 
 

20th-century American male actors
20th-century American male singers
20th-century American singers
21st-century American male actors
21st-century American male singers
21st-century American singers
1948 births
Actors from the New York metropolitan area
Aerosmith members
American country rock singers
American country singer-songwriters
American harmonica players
American heavy metal singers
American Idol participants
American male singer-songwriters
American people of Italian descent
American people of English descent
American people of German descent
American people of Polish descent
American people of African descent
African-American people
American rock songwriters
Blues rock musicians
American tenors
APRA Award winners
Berklee College of Music alumni
Living people
Male actors from Boston
Male actors from New York (state)
Musicians from Boston
Musicians from the New York metropolitan area
New York (state) Republicans
People from Sunapee, New Hampshire
People from Yonkers, New York
Singer-songwriters from Massachusetts
Singer-songwriters from New York (state)
Glam metal musicians
Judges in American reality television series